Eugene F. Shaw (born June 14, 1935), is a politician in the American state of Florida. He served in the Florida House of Representatives from 1966 to 1972, representing the 16th district.

References

1935 births
Living people
Members of the Florida House of Representatives